Bezbeli Apstraklije is a Bosnian punk rock band from Sarajevo, formed in 2014, which already created distinctive pop-rock sound with elements of Psychedelic music.
The band consist of Haris Ljumanović  "Turbo Avaz" (vocals, guitar), Berin Tuzlić a.k.a. "Estamlija" (drums) and Haris Kadenić a.k.a. "Bassistaga" (bass).

In September 2014 Bezbeli Apstraklije released their first album "Kad je bal nek je kanibal" conisiting of twelve songs. It was published by Croatia Records.

References

External links
Official website

Bosnia and Herzegovina rock musicians
Musicians from Sarajevo
Bosnia and Herzegovina musical groups
Musical groups established in 2014
2014 establishments in Bosnia and Herzegovina